In geometry, the inverted snub dodecadodecahedron (or vertisnub dodecadodecahedron) is a nonconvex uniform polyhedron, indexed as U60. It is given a Schläfli symbol sr{5/3,5}.

Cartesian coordinates 
Cartesian coordinates for the vertices of an inverted snub dodecadodecahedron are all the even permutations of
 (±2α, ±2, ±2β),
 (±(α+β/τ+τ), ±(-ατ+β+1/τ), ±(α/τ+βτ-1)),
 (±(-α/τ+βτ+1), ±(-α+β/τ-τ), ±(ατ+β-1/τ)),
 (±(-α/τ+βτ-1), ±(α-β/τ-τ), ±(ατ+β+1/τ)) and
 (±(α+β/τ-τ), ±(ατ-β+1/τ), ±(α/τ+βτ+1)),
with an even number of plus signs, where
 β = (α2/τ+τ)/(ατ−1/τ),
where τ = (1+)/2 is the golden mean and
α is the negative real root of τα4−α3+2α2−α−1/τ, or approximately −0.3352090.
Taking the odd permutations of the above coordinates with an odd number of plus signs gives another form, the enantiomorph of the other one.

Related polyhedra

Medial inverted pentagonal hexecontahedron

The medial inverted pentagonal hexecontahedron (or midly petaloid ditriacontahedron) is a nonconvex isohedral polyhedron. It is the dual of the uniform inverted snub dodecadodecahedron. Its faces are irregular nonconvex pentagons, with one very acute angle.

Proportions

Each face has one medium length edge, two short and two long ones.
,
and the long edges have length
.
The dihedral angle equals . The other real zero of the polynomial  plays a similar role for the medial pentagonal hexecontahedron.

See also 
 List of uniform polyhedra
 Snub dodecadodecahedron

References
 p. 124

External links 
 
 

Uniform polyhedra